Steffi Graf defeated Gabriela Sabatini in the final, 6–4, 3–6, 8–6 to win the ladies' singles tennis title at the 1991 Wimbledon Championships. It was her third Wimbledon singles title and tenth major title overall, while it was Sabatini's third and last appearance in a major final.

Martina Navratilova was the defending champion, but lost in the quarterfinals to Jennifer Capriati.

Seeds

  Steffi Graf (champion)
  Gabriela Sabatini (final)
  Martina Navratilova (quarterfinals)
  Arantxa Sánchez Vicario (quarterfinals)
  Mary Joe Fernández (semifinals)
  Jana Novotná (second round)
  Zina Garrison (quarterfinals)
  Katerina Maleeva (fourth round)
  Jennifer Capriati (semifinals)
  Helena Suková (first round)
  Nathalie Tauziat (fourth round)
  Natasha Zvereva (second round)
  Anke Huber (fourth round)
  Amy Frazier (fourth round)
  Sandra Cecchini (first round)
  Judith Wiesner (fourth round)

The original #1 seed Monica Seles withdrew due to injury before the tournament draw was made. All original seeds from 2-15 moved up one place, and a new #16 seed was added.

Qualifying

Draw

Finals

Top half

Section 1

Section 2

Section 3

Section 4

Bottom half

Section 5

Section 6

Section 7

Section 8

References

External links

1991 Wimbledon Championships – Women's draws and results at the International Tennis Federation

Women's Singles
Wimbledon Championship by year – Women's singles
Wimbledon Championships